Royal Museums Greenwich is an organisation comprising four museums in Greenwich, east London, illustrated below. The Royal Museums Greenwich Foundation is a Private Limited Company by guarantee without share capital use of 'Limited' exemption, company number 08002287, incorporated on 22 March 2012. It is registered as charity number 1147279.

For a year between 2016 and 2017 the Museum reported 2.41 million visitors to the National Maritime Museum.

References

External links
 

Royal Museums Greenwich
Musical instrument museums
Non-departmental public bodies of the United Kingdom government
Museums sponsored by the Department for Digital, Culture, Media and Sport